Musselburgh is the largest settlement in East Lothian, Scotland, on the coast of the Firth of Forth,  east of Edinburgh city centre.

History
The name Musselburgh is Old English in origin, with mussel referring to the shellfish. The burgh element appears to derive from burh, in the same way as Edinburgh, before the introduction of formal burghs by David I. Its earliest Anglic name was Eskmuthe (Eskmouth) for its location at the mouth of the River Esk.

Musselburgh was first settled by the Romans in the years following their invasion of Scotland in AD 80. They built a fort a little inland from the mouth of the River Esk, at Inveresk.

They bridged the Esk downstream from the fort, and thus established the line of the main eastern approach to Scotland's capital for most of the next 2,000 years. The bridge built by the Romans outlasted them by many centuries. It was rebuilt on the original Roman foundations some time before 1300, and in 1597 it was rebuilt again, this time with a third arch added on the east side of the river. The Old Bridge is also known as the Roman Bridge and remains in use today by pedestrians. To its north is the New Bridge, designed by John Rennie the Elder and built in 1806. This in turn was considerably widened in 1925.

Musselburgh was made a burgh of barony c.1315 and a burgh of regality in 1562. The town attempted to become a royal burgh in 1632 but this was prevented by opposition from Edinburgh burgesses. Although Edinburgh is now known to have been a burgh by 1125, Musselburgh's antiquity is reflected in the Scots-language traditional rhyme:

Musselburgh is known as "The Honest Toun", and celebrates this by the annual election of the Honest Lad and Lass. The town motto "Honestas dates back to 1332, when the Regent of Scotland, Randolph, Earl of Moray, died in the burgh after a long illness during which he was devotedly cared for by the townsfolk. His successor offered to reward the people for their loyalty but they declined, saying they were only doing their duty. The new regent, the Earl of Mar, was impressed and said they were a set of honest men, hence "Honest Toun".

Archaeological excavations by Headland Archaeology between 2003–04, as part of work to renew the water mains, found that the Medieval town was concentrated on the High Street and that occupation in the North High Street area and Fisherrow only dates to the 16th century or later. The early town was centered on the eastern side of the river Esk.

The town and its population grew considerably throughout the latter half of the twentieth century, with major local authority and private housing developments on both the eastern and western outskirts.

The Battle of Pinkie Cleugh was fought south of Musselburgh.

Town Council 
Prior to the local government reforms of 1975, Musselburgh was a small burgh within the county of Midlothian. As such, it elected a town council responsible for a number of areas of local governance, including housing, lighting and street cleaning and drainage. Midlothian County Council was responsible for other areas, including education. The town council met at the Musselburgh Tolbooth and later, for a short period before its abolition, at the Brunton Hall. The town's civic head and chairman of the council was the provost and there were three bailies and a treasurer.

After the local government reforms of 1975, Musselburgh was transferred to the East Lothian district of the new Lothian region, and subsequently became part of the East Lothian unitary council area in 1996.

Demography

Population 
At the 2011 census, the population was 19,159 and 93% of residents were born in the United Kingdom.

Religion 
At the 2011 Census, 52% of Musselburgh residents stated they belonged to a religion, with 51% being Christians, and there are several churches catering to different denominations.

Church of Scotland 
There are three Church of Scotland ecclesiastical parishes in Musselburgh, each with its own church:

 North Esk
 St. Andrew's High
 St. Michael's, Inveresk

Roman Catholicism 
There is one Roman Catholic congregation which worships at Our Lady of Loretto and St Michael Catholic Church.

Scottish Episcopal Church 
There is one Scottish Episcopal congregation which worships at St Peter's Church.

Other Churches 

 Harbour Church
 Hope Church
 Musselburgh Baptist Church
 Musselburgh Congregational Church

Education
Schools include Loretto School, a private boarding school, and Musselburgh Grammar School, the local large comprehensive that is one of the oldest grammar schools in the country, dating from 1608. Primary schools include: Campie Primary School, Musselburgh Burgh Primary School, Stoneyhill Primary School, Pinkie St Peter's Primary School, Loretto RC Primary School and Loretto Nippers (private). Early learning locations (ages 3–5) include The Burgh, Stoneyhill, Loretto RC, and St. Ninian's. There are also several private nurseries for pre school aged children.

Edinburgh's Queen Margaret University has relocated all its schools from Edinburgh to Musselburgh . Her Majesty The Queen officially opened the QMU campus in July 2008.

Transport

Railway
Musselburgh is served by two railway stations. It is a relatively new station, having opened in 1988. The other station serving the town is Wallyford railway station to the east of the town in the village of Wallyford, which opened in 1994.

The town's original station was close to the town centre at the end of a short branch from Newhailes Junction. Passenger services from there ceased in 1964, and the line closed to all traffic in the early 1970s. The former railway line is now a road bypassing the Fisherrow area of the town. There was also a station at Fisherrow.

Bus
The town is served by Lothian Buses, East Coast Buses and Prentice Coaches Ltd.

Roads
The A1 by-passes the town and meets the A720 Edinburgh City Bypass at the edge of the town before continuing to Edinburgh city centre. The A199 goes through the High Street to Edinburgh in the west and to Dunbar to the east. This was originally the A1 until the town's bypass was built in the mid-1980s.

Sport
The Musselburgh Silver Arrow is reputed to be the oldest sporting trophy in United Kingdom, and is competed for annually by the Royal Company of Archers. It dates back to at least 1603.

Musselburgh is home to both Musselburgh Racecourse and Musselburgh Links golf course. The links, a former venue of golf's Open Championship, have recently been acknowledged as the oldest continuously played golf course in the world. Musselburgh Athletic F.C. are the town's football team, competing in the East of Scotland League at their Olivebank Park ground in the west of the town. Musselburgh also boast some of the best grassroots teams for young players, such as the Musselburgh Windsor and the Musselburgh Youngstars. Musselburgh RFC play in the Scottish Premiership at Stoneyhill.

The Musselburgh Roads Cycling Club was formed in January 1936 by a breakaway group of 16 from the Musselburgh Clarion. After forming an alliance with other clubs during the war, the MRCC reformed again in its own right in January 1945. The club has a long and successful history of competitive cycling. Notable riders include: Jock Allison, who in 1945 won the British Best All Rounder title and is to date still the only Scottish club rider to do so; Janet Sutherland, who dominated Scottish woman's cycling in 1951–4; and Sandy Gilchrist, who in 1977 won 5 individual and 4 team Scottish Championships. Many other riders from the club have won national championships or have been selected to compete at world championship level or the Commonwealth Games. Today, club members take part in track racing, road racing, time trials, cyclo cross and mountain biking. Their base is at the Tolbooth in the High Street.

There is also a locally run darts league, the Musselburgh and District Darts League, comprising an A and B league, each containing eight teams. Many players from this league represent the Lothian team at county level.

In Musselburgh there is also an amateur swimming club called Musselburgh Amateur Swimming Club. The club is home to the Musselburgh Marlins and trains at Musselburgh Sports Centre. The members of the club vary in ages from 6 all the way up to adults. The club is very inclusive in the community and was first established in 1886 and in its current format in 1994 where they trained at Loretto Swimming Pool which is now closed.

The East Lothian Seagulls of the Scottish Floorball League are based in Musselburgh and train and play matches at the sports centre at Queen Margaret University.

Notable people

Acting
James Martin, best known for his role as Eric in Still Game. Although not from Musselburgh originally, he has lived in the county since 1974.
Medicine
David Macbeth Moir, physician and writer
Military
John Grieve, recipient of the Victoria Cross
Writers and artists
Alexander Carrick, sculptor
Margaret Oliphant, novelist and historical writer, who usually wrote as Mrs Oliphant
Sports
Gary Anderson, darts player
Alistair Brown, footballer
Billy Brown, football coach
John Clark, footballer
Jason Holt,  footballer
Willie Jamieson, footballer
Jim Jefferies, football manager
John McGlynn, football manager
Michael McKenna, footballer
Paul McLean, footballer
Bill McPhillips, footballer
Kenny Miller, footballer
Alan Morgan, footballer
Ross Muir, professional snooker player
Scott Murray, rugby union player
Yvonne Murray, athlete
Colin Nish, footballer
Willie Ormond, footballer and manager
Kirsten Reilly, footballer
Kris Renton, footballer
George Walker, footballer
John White, footballer
Various
Callum Beattie, singer-songwriter
Rhona Cameron, comedian
Kirsten Imrie, professional model and former Page Three girl

Areas

Fisherrow, Inveresk, Levenhall Links, Pinkie, Stoneyhill, Clayknowes, Denholm, Stoneybank, Queen Margaret University Student Village, Monktonhall, Pinkie Braes

Twin towns
Musselburgh is twinned with:
 Champigny-sur-Marne (France) 
 Rosignano Marittimo (Italy)
"Champigny was already twinned with Rosignano, so a three-way link was considered advantageous."

Gallery

See also
John Muir Way
List of places in East Lothian

References

Notes

Citations

Sources

External links

Census data (PDF)
Musselburgh Festival
Video footage of Fisherrow Harbour

 
Towns in East Lothian